Mohammad Al-Wadi (born 17 August 1985) is a Jordanian boxer. He competed in the men's featherweight event at the 2020 Summer Olympics.

References

External links
 

1985 births
Living people
Jordanian male boxers
Olympic boxers of Jordan
Boxers at the 2020 Summer Olympics
People from Zarqa
21st-century Jordanian people